Momčilo "Moma" Marković (Serbian Cyrillic: Момчило Мома Марковић; 16 November 1912 – 7 August 1992) was a Serbian communist politician.

He was awarded the Order of the People's Hero on 6 July 1953.

Personal life
His father  was also a member of the Communist Party of Yugoslavia (KPJ) and a delegate at the 2nd KPJ Congress in 1920 held in Vukovar. From Moma's relationship with Vera Miletić he had a daughter named Mira Marković who was later married to Serbian president Slobodan Milošević. Dragoslav Marković, President of Serbia, was his younger brother.

References

External links

1912 births
1992 deaths
Serbian communists
Yugoslav communists
Yugoslav Partisans members
Recipients of the Order of the People's Hero
Slobodan Milošević
Burials at Belgrade New Cemetery